The 2018 Charlotte Independence season is the club's fourth season of existence, and their fourth in the United Soccer League, the second tier of American soccer.

Background 

The Independence finished the 2017 season with a record of 13–9–10, finished 5th in the Eastern Conference, and 11th overall. In the 2017 USL Playoffs, Charlotte were bested in the first round by the Rochester Rhinos. Elsewhere, the Independence reached the third round of the 2017 U.S. Open Cup, losing 1–4 to NASL outfit, North Carolina FC.

Club

Roster

Competitions

Friendlies 
All times in regular season on Eastern Daylight Time (UTC-04:00)

USL Regular season

Standings

Results summary

Matches 
All times in regular season on Eastern Daylight Time (UTC-04:00)

U.S. Open Cup

References

External links 
Official Website

Charlotte Independence seasons
Charlotte Independence
Charlotte Independence
2018 in sports in North Carolina